Attilio Rota (born 29 April 1945) is an Italian former professional racing cyclist. He rode in the 1974 and 1976 Tour de France as well as in eleven editions of the Giro d'Italia.

Major results

1968
 1st Gran Premio della Liberazione
1969
 1st Milano–Vignola
 3rd Giro di Toscana
 8th Trofeo Baracchi (with Oliviero Morotti)
1970
 2nd Sassari–Cagliari
 2nd GP Alghero
 5th Gran Premio Industria e Commercio di Prato
 6th Gran Premio Città di Camaiore
 9th Trofeo Baracchi (with Oliviero Morotti)
1973
 6th Giro dell'Umbria
1974
 10th Tre Valli Varesine
1977
 3rd GP Industria & Artigianato

Grand Tour general classification results timeline

References

External links
 

1945 births
Living people
Italian male cyclists
People from Clusone
Cyclists from the Province of Bergamo